Michael Aitkens (born 1947) is a British actor and writer of drama scripts for movies, television and stage. His BBC situation comedy Waiting for God, first shown in 1990, was BAFTA nominated.

Michael Aitkens was educated at Haileybury in England. He then lived in Australia for ten years and Los Angeles, United States, for two years, graduating from the AFI Conservatory (Los Angeles) in 1981.

In the mid-1980s, Aitkens featured in the Australian children's television series The Henderson Kids as Walter Mullens, the long lost father of Tam and Steve Henderson.

More than 150 of his scripts have been produced in the United Kingdom, United States and Australia. He now lives in London, where he works as a writer/producer, mainly of his own original series, and formed an independent production company, DAISYLU. He is also an occasional humorous newspaper columnist.

He has been a core writer for Midsomer Murders since 2006.

External links
 
 MSN Entertainment – Michael Aitkens

1947 births
Living people
British expatriates in Australia
English expatriates in the United States
English male television actors
English television writers
Male actors from London
Logie Award winners
People educated at Haileybury and Imperial Service College
British male television writers
20th-century English writers
20th-century English male writers
21st-century English writers
21st-century English male writers